Paul Edingue Ekane (born 23 September 1990) is a Cameroonian swimmer specializing in freestyle. He competed in the 50 m event at the 2012 Summer Olympics. He placed sixth in his heat and thus did not qualify for the semi-finals of the event. Ekane is one of seven Cameroonian athletes who disappeared from the Olympic Village during the Olympics, sparking speculation that they would attempt to defect to the United Kingdom.

References 

1990 births
Living people
Cameroonian male freestyle swimmers
Swimmers at the 2012 Summer Olympics
Olympic swimmers of Cameroon
Missing people
20th-century Cameroonian people
21st-century Cameroonian people